Spica luteola is a moth in the family Drepanidae. It was described by Swinhoe in 1889. It is found in India, Nepal and Tibet, China.

References

Moths described in 1889
Thyatirinae